Southard is an unincorporated community in Blaine County, Oklahoma, United States. Southard has a post office with ZIP code 73770.

References

Unincorporated communities in Blaine County, Oklahoma
Unincorporated communities in Oklahoma